Precious Babes (simplified Chinese: 3个女人一个宝) is a Singaporean Chinese family drama produced by MatrixVision, revolving around the lives of three women who are childhood friends. It made its debut on Singapore's free-to-air channel, MediaCorp Channel 8 on 9 June 2010 and ended on 6 July 2010. It stars Ann Kok , Cynthia Koh , Eelyn Kok , Qi Yuwu , Zheng Geping & Alan Tern as the casts of the series. Consisting of 20 episodes, the drama was screened every weekday night at 9.00 pm. It is also a mid year blockbuster for 2010.

This drama made its rerun from 30 June 2011 and ended on 27 July 2011.

This drama is also imported on one of Malaysia's free-to-air channel, NTV7, weekdays at 6.00pm, made its debut on 6 June 2011 and ended on 1 July 2011.

Cast

Trivia
 This drama marked the return of Qi Yuwu after The Little Nyonya.
 Andie Chen was nominated for the Best Supporting Actor in Star Awards 2011.
 Viewers had reported Cynthia Koh showing part of her boobs while landing on "Jovan"'s buttocks in episode 2. This part is removed in the encore telecast and on NTV7's premiere.
 In another episode, viewers reported Cynthia Koh had accidentally exposed her white panties under her red nightgown as she jumped on the bed.

Singapore Chinese dramas
2010 Singaporean television series debuts
2010 Singaporean television series endings
Channel 8 (Singapore) original programming